Sir Chethimattathu Philip (Sir C. P.) is a 2015 Malayalam thriller film by Shajoon Kariyal with Jayaram in the title role. Honey Rose is doing the role of lady lead in this film. Lyrics of the movie were penned by Dr Madhu Vasudevan.

Cast
 Jayaram as Sir CP (Chethimattathu Philip)
 Honey Rose as Alice
 Rohini as Kochu Mary
 Seema as Mary
 Vijayaraghavan as Sharadi Maash
 Hareesh Peradi as Kuriyachan
 Bhagath Manuel as Sajan
 Baiju Ezhupunna as Isaac
 Rahul Madhavr
 Jayakrishnan as Chethimattathu Mathews, CP's father
 Mukundan
 Sadiq as Kuruvilla
 Bheeman Raghu as himself (Guest Appearance)

Reception 
A critic from The Times of India wrote that "In the end, Sir CP is yet another stale family story that you can watch if you have no other option".

References

2015 films
2010s Malayalam-language films
Films directed by Shajoon Kariyal